Rauno Tamme (born 7 April 1992) is an Estonian volleyball player who plays for the Estonian volleyball club TalTech. He is a member of the Estonia men's national volleyball team.

Estonian national team
As a member of the senior Estonia men's national volleyball team, Tamme competed at the 2015 and 2019 Men's European Volleyball Championships.

Sporting achievements

Clubs
Baltic League
  2009/2010 – with Pere Leib Tartu
  2017/2018 – with Saaremaa
  2018/2019 – with Saaremaa
  2020/2021 – with Saaremaa
  2021/2022 – with TalTech

National championship
 2009/2010  Estonian Championship, with Pere Leib Tartu
 2010/2011  Estonian Championship, with Pere Leib Tartu
 2015/2016  Estonian Championship, with Rakvere
 2016/2017  Estonian Championship, with Selver Tallinn
 2017/2018  Estonian Championship, with Saaremaa
 2018/2019  Estonian Championship, with Saaremaa
 2020/2021  Estonian Championship, with Saaremaa
 2021/2022  Estonian Championship, with TalTech

National cup
 2011/2012  Estonian Cup, with Pere Leib Tartu
 2015/2016  Estonian Cup, with Rakvere
 2016/2017  Estonian Cup, with Selver Tallinn
 2017/2018  Estonian Cup, with Saaremaa
 2018/2019  Estonian Cup, with Saaremaa
 2019/2020  Estonian Cup, with Saaremaa

National team
 2016  European League
 2018  European League
 2018  Challenger Cup

References

External links

1992 births
Living people
Estonian men's volleyball players
Sportspeople from Viljandi